Sir David Evan Naunton Davies  (born 28 October 1935) is a British electrical engineer and educator, knighted for services to science and technology in the 1994 New Year Honours.

Career
1985–1988: Head of the Department of Electronic and Electrical Engineering at University College London (UCL), and holder of the Pender Chair, having already been lecturing there, in Communications Systems, for many years prior to that.
1986–1988: Vice-Provost of University College London
1988–1993: Vice Chancellor of Loughborough University
1993–1999: Chief Scientific Adviser for the Ministry of Defence

He has subsequently been Chairman of Railway Safety, a non-executive director of Lattice plc, a non-executive director of The ERA Foundation, Chairman of the Hazards Forum (2002-2010), and safety advisor to the Board of National Grid plc.

Voluntary roles
1994–1995: President of the Institution of Electrical Engineers (IEE)
1996–2001, President of the Royal Academy of Engineering

Awards and honours
CBE (Commander of the Order of the British Empire),
 Knight Bachelor
FREng (Fellow of the Royal Academy of Engineering),
FRS (Fellow of the Royal Society)
Faraday Medal, Institution of Electrical Engineers, 1987
Received an honorary doctorate from University of Bath in 1997
Received an honorary doctorate from Heriot-Watt University in 1999

The Sir David Davies building at Loughborough University, housing the electrical engineering department, is now named after him.

References

1935 births
Living people
Academics of University College London
Chief Scientific Advisers to the Ministry of Defence
Commanders of the Order of the British Empire
British electrical engineers
Fellows of the Royal Academy of Engineering
Fellows of the Royal Society
Foreign Members of the Russian Academy of Sciences
Knights Bachelor
People named in the Panama Papers
Presidents of the Royal Academy of Engineering
Vice-Chancellors of Loughborough University